Kurista is a village in Kastre Parish, Tartu County, Estonia. It is located just southwest of Võnnu. In 2000 Kurista had a population of 135. Prior to the administrative reform of Estonian local governments in 2017, the village belonged to Võnnu Parish.

Kurista Manor (Kurrista) was established after the Great Northern War by detaching the land from Ahja Manor. Until 1902 it belonged to the Villebois. The small flush joint eclectic main building was constructed of bricks in the second half of the 19th century. A large park is surrounding the manorhouse. In the western end of the park there's the family cemetery of de Villebois'.

References

External links
Kurista Manor at Estonian Manors Portal

Villages in Tartu County